The British Rail Class 308 alternating current (AC) electric multiple units (EMU) were built by British Railways' Holgate Road carriage works in three batches between 1959 and 1961. They were initially classified as AM8 units before the introduction of TOPS.

Description

Class 308/1
The first batch of 33 units were built in 1959, classified as AM8 and numbered 133–165. This was later changed to Class 308/1 under the TOPS system, and units were renumbered 308133–165. Each unit was formed of four carriages: two outer driving trailers, an intermediate trailer, and a motor coach.

Electrically the Class 308 stock has the same equipment as the Class 302 stock with a few modifications, some of these are the types of overload, the use of fan-cooled rectifier continued until the rectifiers were modified to 8-diode type from 1982. This modified main rectifier was also modified and used on the Class 309 stock due to the problems of fan-cooled types suffering from blocked filters causing failures in traffic.

From 1981 to 1983, the units were refurbished, which included opening out compartments, fitting of gangways between carriages, and moving first class seating from the intermediate trailer to one of the driving trailers, with the same problems as the Class 302 stock of having first class passengers sitting above the Westinghouse CM38 compressor, however the Gresley bogies being retained. In this modified form, the technical description of the formation was BDTCOL+MBSO+TSOL+DTSO. Individual carriages were numbered as follows:
75878-75886 and 75896-75919 - BDTCOL
61883-61915 - MBSO
70611-70643 - TSOL
75887-75895 and 75929-75952 - DTSO

Class 308/2
These units were later reclassified as Class 308/2 under TOPS. Each unit was formed of four carriages: two outer driving trailers, an intermediate trailer, and a motor luggage van, with the reduction in luggage some MLV's were converted at Swindon Works with a different seating arrangement to the original passenger vehicles. The technical description of the formation was BDTS+MLV+TC+DTS. Individual carriages were numbered as follows:
75920-75928 - BDTS
68011-68019 - MLV (68011 - 68014 from units 313-316 converted to MBSO in 1971 and renumbered 62431–62434. Units reclassified as Class 308/4)
70644-70652 - TC
75953-75961 - DTS
When Tilbury Docks closed as a cruise liner terminal, these units were made redundant and withdrawn from service in 1983. Three units were subsequently rebuilt as Class 308/4 parcels units for Rail Express Systems (see below).

Class 308/3
They were numbered 453–455, following on from the Class 305/1 units, which also operated these services (which were numbered in the range 401–452).

These units were later reclassified as Class 308/3, and renumbered 308453–455 under TOPS. Unlike the first batch, these units contained no first-class seating. Each unit was formed of three carriages: two outer driving trailers, and an intermediate motor coach. The technical description of the unit formation was BDTS+MBS+DTS. Individual carriages numbers were as follows:
75741-75743 - BDTS
61689-61691 - MBS
75992-75994 - DTS
These units were withdrawn in the late 1980s.

Converted postal units
In 1983, three former Class 308/2 units (nos. 314/319/321) were converted into Class 308/4 postal units by the Parcels sector, with the removal of the intermediate trailer, and renumbered 308991–993. These units were replaced by three converted Class 302/9 parcels units in 1992.

Operations
By the early 1990s, only the Class 308/1 units were still in service. These were gradually replaced on GEML services by the new Class 321s. Some of the displaced units were transferred to the London, Tilbury and Southend line (LTS), whilst others were transferred to the West Midlands to work Cross-City Line services pending the introduction of new Class 323s. The LTS units were later displaced by Class 312s, but two were retained and converted to Class 937 sandite units. These sandite units were originally fitted with a small cement mixer that was used to mix the sandite and then loaded into the hoppers whilst the vehicle was in motion. Later, premixed sandite was loaded prior to use with the easing of the physical work by the staff.

As no new stock had been ordered, Regional Railways overhauled Class 308 units for use on these services. The work was carried out at Doncaster Works and involved reducing the unit length to three carriages, with the removal of the intermediate trailers, which were scrapped. The trains were also painted in West Yorkshire Metro crimson and cream livery.

In 1996, with the privatisation of British Rail, the Class 308 fleet passed into the ownership of Angel Trains and were leased to the Regional Railways North East franchise. This was originally operated as Northern Spirit, but the franchise was later taken over by Arriva and operated as Arriva Trains Northern.

By the late 1990s, it was clear that the elderly Class 308 units needed replacing. Due to their age, they were increasingly unreliable and expensive to maintain. They were replaced by sixteen new 3-car Class 333 units, which were introduced from 12 January 2001, all 16 Class 333 units were later lengthened to 4-car sets.
The Class 308 units were withdrawn and sent for storage at MoD Shoeburyness. The final three units, nos. 308138/157/158, were withdrawn in late 2001, and were sent for scrap at Immingham. Since then, the stored units have slowly been scrapped at various locations, with the final vehicles disposed of in 2004. However, one driving trailer was saved for preservation.

Accidents and incidents

Preservation

One driving trailer from unit 308136 has been saved for preservation.
75881 - Colne Valley Railway . Restoration ongoing.

The carriage has been stripped of asbestos, and the full internal rebuild was abandoned in favour of housing the salvaged parts of the London Underground Victoria Line Cobourg Street signalling centre, and much of the former Brixton interlocking machine room equipment. The Cobourg Street equipment is now partially working, with work ongoing to allow simulated train movements to be displayed.

Fleet details

References

Sources

Further reading

External links

308
Train-related introductions in 1959
25 kV AC multiple units